Thomas Meehan School is a historic former school building located in the Germantown neighborhood of Philadelphia, Pennsylvania. It was built in 1901–1902, and is a two-story, five bay, stone building in the Colonial Revival-style. It features a portico with Doric order columns, arched openings, and a modillioned cornice.  It was used for industrial purposes in the mid-20th century, and now is home to the Pentecostal Faith Assembly Church.

The building was added to the National Register of Historic Places in 1988.

References

School buildings on the National Register of Historic Places in Philadelphia
Colonial Revival architecture in Pennsylvania
School buildings completed in 1902
Germantown, Philadelphia
1902 establishments in Pennsylvania